Buluggin ibn Muhammad (died 1062) was the ruler of the Hammadids from 1055 to 1062. He led an army into Morocco against the Almoravids and briefly captured Fes.

Reign 
Buluggin succeeded his cousin Muhsin ibn Qaid, whom he assassinated in 1055. After killing Muhsin, Buluggin killed his vizier and the governor of Biskra, Ja'far ibn Abi Rumman, because he doubted his loyalty. This assassination provoked a revolt of the population of Biskra. The Sanhajian Army, commanded by Khalaf ibn Abi Haydara, took the city by storm. The main Biskrians, probably all Banu Rumman, were sent to Qal'a where Buluggin had them all killed.

Expedition against the Almoravids 
In 14 Feb or 14 Mar 1062, Buluggin took the road to Morocco, where the Almoravid leader Yusuf ibn Tashufin was shaking the Zanatian Empire. Buluggin took advantage of the fact that the Zanatian emir al-Fatuh had moved away from his capital, Fez, to enter. Buluggin does not seem to have met the Almoravids. Yusuf ibn Tashfin, no doubt aware of the possibility of lightning incursions from the east and anxious to reserve his forces—still insufficient to subjugate the Masmuda—retreated to the Sahara.

On his withdrawal, Buluggin was assassinated by an agent of his successor Nasir ibn Alnas.

References 

11th-century Berber people
11th-century rulers in Africa
Hammadids